The Graphics Interface (GI) conference is the oldest continuously scheduled conference devoted to computer graphics, and human–computer interaction. GI was held biannually between 1969 and 1981, and has been held annually since then. Prior to 1982, the conference was called Canadian Man-Computer Communications Conference (CMCCC).

This conference is sponsored by the Canadian Human–Computer Communications Society.  The conference has a tradition of being co-located with the Canadian Conference on Artificial Intelligence (AI), and the Canadian Conference on Computer and Robot Vision (CRV), which was formerly known as Vision Interface (VI).

Awards 

The Canadian Human–Computer Communications Society honours the memory of Michael A. J. Sweeney through an annual award to the best student paper presented at each year's Graphics Interface conference.

Alain Fournier and Bill Buxton Ph.D. Dissertation Annual Awards are given to best dissertations in Computer Graphics and Human-Computer Interaction defended in a Canadian University, and are announced officially during the Graphics Interface conference.

Venues

References

External links 
 AI/GI/CRV Recent Conferences

Computer graphics conferences
Human–computer interaction